Salmonidae  is a family of ray-finned fish that constitutes the only currently extant family in the order Salmoniformes . It includes salmon (both Atlantic and Pacific species), trout (both ocean-going and landlocked), chars, freshwater whitefishes, graylings, taimens and lenoks, which are collectively known as the salmonids ("salmon-like fish"). The Atlantic salmon (Salmo salar), whose Latin name became that of its genus Salmo, is also the source of the family and order names.

Salmonids have a relatively primitive appearance among the teleost fish, with the pelvic fins being placed far back, and an adipose fin towards the rear of the back. They have slender bodies, with rounded scales and forked tails, and their mouths contain a single row of sharp teeth.

All salmonids spawn in fresh water of upper reaches of rivers and creeks, but in many cases, the fish spend most of their adult lives at sea or in brackish estuaries, returning to the rivers only to reproduce. This lifecycle is described as anadromous. Salmonids are carnivorous predators of the middle food chain, feeding on small crustaceans, aquatic insects and smaller fish, and in turn being preyed upon by larger predators. Many species of salmonids are thus considered keystone organisms important for both freshwater and terrestrial ecosystems due to the biomass transfer provided by their mass migration between oceanic and inland waterbodies.

Evolution 
Current salmonids comprise three lineages, taxonomically treated as subfamilies: Coregoninae (freshwater whitefishes), Thymallinae (graylings), and Salmoninae (trout, salmon, char, taimens and lenoks). Generally, all three lineages are accepted to allocate a suite of derived traits indicating a monophyletic group.

The Salmonidae first appear in the fossil record in the Middle Eocene with Eosalmo driftwoodensis, which was first described from fossils found at Driftwood Creek, central British Columbia. This genus shares traits found in all three subfamily lineages. Hence, E. driftwoodensis is an archaic salmonid, representing an important stage in salmonid evolution.

A gap appears in the salmonine fossil record after E. driftwoodensis until about 7 million years ago (mya), in the Late Miocene, when trout-like fossils appear in Idaho, in the Clarkia Lake beds. Several of these species appear to be Oncorhynchus — the current genus for Pacific salmon and Pacific trout. The presence of these species so far inland established that Oncorhynchus was not only present in the Pacific drainages before the beginning of the Pliocene (~5–6 mya), but also that rainbow and cutthroat trout, and Pacific salmon lineages had diverged before the beginning of the Pliocene. Consequently, the split between Oncorhynchus and Salmo (Atlantic salmon and European trout) must have occurred well before the Pliocene. Suggestions have gone back as far as the Early Miocene (about 20 mya).

Genetics 
Based on the most current evidence, salmonids diverged from the rest of teleost fish no later than 88 million years ago, during the late Cretaceous. This divergence was marked by a whole-genome duplication event in the ancestral salmonid, where the diploid ancestor became tetraploid. This duplication is the fourth of its kind to happen in the evolutionary lineage of the salmonids, with two having occurred commonly to all bony vertebrates, and another specifically in the teleost fishes.

Extant salmonids all show evidence of partial tetraploidy, as studies show the genome has undergone selection to regain a diploid state. Work done in the rainbow trout (Onchorhynchus mykiss) has shown that the genome is still partially-tetraploid. Around half of the duplicated protein-coding genes have been deleted, but all apparent miRNA sequences still show full duplication, with potential to influence regulation of the rainbow trout's genome. This pattern of partial tetraploidy is thought to be reflected in the rest of extant salmonids.

The first fossil species representing a true salmonid fish (E. driftwoodensis) does not appear until the middle Eocene. This fossil already displays traits associated with extant salmonids, but as the genome of E. driftwoodensis cannot be sequenced, it cannot be confirmed if polyploidy was present in this animal at this point in time. This fossil is also significantly younger than the proposed salmonid divergence from the rest of the teleost fishes, and is the earliest confirmed salmonid currently known. This means that the salmonids have a ghost lineage of approximately 33 million years.

Given a lack of earlier transition fossils, and the inability to extract genomic data from specimens other than extant species, the dating of the whole-genome duplication event in salmonids was historically a very broad categorization of times, ranging from 25 to 100 million years in age. New advances in calibrated relaxed molecular clock analyses have allowed for a closer examination of the salmonid genome, and has allowed for a more precise dating of the whole-genome duplication of the group, that places the latest possible date for the event at 88 million years ago.

This more precise dating and examination of the salmonid whole-genome duplication event has allowed more speculation on the radiation of species within the group. Historically, the whole-genome duplication event was thought to be the reason for the variation within Salmonidae. Current evidence done with molecular clock analyses revealed that much of the speciation of the group occurred during periods of intense climate change associated with the last ice ages, with especially high speciation rates being observed in salmonids that developed an anadromous lifestyle.

Classification 
Together with the closely related Esociformes (the pikes and related fishes), Osmeriformes (e.g. smelts), and Argentiniformes, the Salmoniformes comprise the superorder Protacanthopterygii.

The Salmonidae are divided into three subfamilies and around 10 genera containing about 220 species. The concepts of the number of species recognised vary among researchers and authorities; the numbers presented below represent the higher estimates of diversity:

Order Salmoniformes
 Family: Salmonidae
 Subfamily: Coregoninae
 Coregonus - whitefishes (78 species)
 Prosopium - round whitefishes (six species)
 Stenodus - beloribitsa and nelma (one or two species)
 Subfamily: Thymallinae
 Thymallus - graylings (14 species)
 Subfamily: Salmoninae
 Tribe: Salmonini
 Salmo - Atlantic salmon and trout (47 species)
 Salvelinus - Char and trout (e.g. brook trout, lake trout) (51 species)
 Salvethymus - Long-finned char (one species)
 Tribe: Oncorhynchini
 Brachymystax - lenoks (four species)
 † Eosalmo (one species, Eocene)
 Hucho - taimens (four species)
 Oncorhynchus - Pacific salmon and trout (12 species)
 Parahucho - Sakhalin taimen (one species)

Hybrid crossbreeding 
The following table shows results of hybrid crossbreeding combination in Salmonidae.

note :- : The identical kind,  O : (survivability), X : (Fatality)

References

Further reading 

 Behnke, Robert J. Trout and Salmon of North America, Illustrated by Joseph R. Tomelleri. 1st Chanticleer Press ed. New York: The Free Press, 2002. 
 
 
 
 
 

 
Ray-finned fish families
Articles which contain graphical timelines
Extant Late Cretaceous first appearances
Taxa named by Georges Cuvier